Hallowed Ground is the second studio album by grunge band, Skin Yard, released in 1988.

Track listing
 "Stranger" (music: House/Endino/McCullum; lyrics: McMillan) - 3:36
 "Open Fist" (music: House/Endino; lyrics: McMillan) - 3:58
 "G.O.D." (music: House/Endino; lyrics: McMillan) - 5:29
 "Needle Tree" (music: House/McCullum; lyrics: McMillan) - 3:13
 "Burn" (music: House/Endino; lyrics: McMillan) - 4:55
 "Hallowed Ground" (music: House/Endino; lyrics: McMillan) - 3:11
 "In the Black House" (music & lyrics: McMillan) - 5:36
 "Throb" (music: House/Endino; lyrics: McMillan) - 5:50
 "OP4" (House/Endino/Nerm) - 4:49

The CD reissue of the album had two bonus tracks:
 "Wither" (music: House/Endino/McCullum; lyrics: McMillan) - 3:00
 "American Nightmare" (music: Endino; lyrics: McMillan) - 2:29

Personnel
Jack Endino - Guitar, producer, engineering
Daniel House - Bass
Scott McCullum - Drums
Ben McMillan - Vocals

References

External links
Information about Hallowed Ground on band page
Information about Hallowed Ground on Endino page

Skin Yard albums
1988 albums
Albums produced by Jack Endino
Toxic Shock Records albums